Trace is the debut studio album by American rock band Son Volt, released on September 19, 1995, through Warner Bros. Records. The band was formed the previous year by Jay Farrar after the breakup of the influential alt-country band Uncle Tupelo. Prior to its release, there was debate about whether Son Volt or Wilco, Uncle Tupelo's other offshoot, would produce a better album.

Trace was a critical and commercial success, and peaked at number 166 on the Billboard 200 chart and number 7 on the Billboard Heatseekers Albums chart. The album's second single, "Drown", was a radio hit, and charted at  number 10 on the Billboard Mainstream Rock Tracks chart and number 25 on the Billboard Modern Rock Tracks chart (and was their only single to make either chart). By 2009, Trace had sold 297,000 copies in the United States, and outsold Wilco's A.M., released six months before, two-to-one. It is Son Volt's only album to outsell Wilco.

Reception 

Trace received critical acclaim. According to AllMusic, "Throughout Son Volt's debut, Trace, the group reworks classic honky tonk and rock & roll, adding a desperate, determined edge to their performances. Even when they rock out, there is a palpable sense of melancholy to Farrar's voice, which lends a poignancy to the music." AmericanaUK calls Trace, "A graceful masterpiece, a positive turning of the page for Farrar, and a gentle reminder of the power and long-lasting influence of Uncle Tupelo." 

In 1996, Trace placed ninth on Rolling Stone's 1995 critics' list.

Track listing
All songs written by Farrar except "Mystifies Me", written by Ronnie Wood.
 "Windfall" – 2:58
 "Live Free" – 3:13
 "Tear Stained Eye" – 4:21
 "Route" – 3:57
 "Ten Second News" – 3:57
 "Drown" – 3:20
 "Loose String" – 3:48
 "Out of the Picture" – 3:50
 "Catching On" – 4:02
 "Too Early" – 4:29
 "Mystifies Me" – 4:12

Personnel
 Dave Boquist - guitar, banjo, fiddle, lap steel guitar, dobro
 Jim Boquist - bass, backing vocals
 Jay Farrar - vocals, guitar
 Mike Heidorn - drums
 Eric Heywood - pedal steel guitar
 Craig Krampf - drums on "Live Free"
 Dan Newton - accordion on "Too Early"
 Marc Perlman - bass on "Mystifies Me"

Charts

References

 

1995 debut albums
Son Volt albums
Warner Records albums